Dai Jianye (born 1956) is a Chinese Classical literature researcher who is a professor at Central China Normal University.

Biography
Dai was born in Macheng, Hubei, in 1956. In 1985 he graduated from Central China Normal University. After graduation, he taught at the university.

Works

Honours and awards
 2016 Mingde Teacher Award (Hong Kong)

References

1956 births
Living people
People from Macheng
Central China Normal University alumni
Academic staff of the Central China Normal University
Chinese scholars
Chinese literature academics